The 1932 United States presidential election in Louisiana took place on November 8, 1932, as part of the 1932 United States presidential election. Louisiana voters chose ten representatives, or electors, to the Electoral College, who voted for president and vice president.

Louisiana was won by Governor Franklin D. Roosevelt (D–New York), running with Speaker John Nance Garner, with 92.79 percent of the popular vote, against incumbent President Herbert Hoover (R–California), running with Vice President Charles Curtis, with 7.01 percent of the popular vote.

By percentage of the popular vote won, Louisiana was Roosevelt's third-best state, behind only South Carolina and Mississippi.

Results

Results by parish

See also
 United States presidential elections in Louisiana

References

Louisiana
1932
1932 Louisiana elections